Guttenberg is a municipality in the district of Kulmbach in Bavaria in Germany. 

The town is closely tied to House of Guttenberg, who have been associated with the locality since the Middle Ages and still own most of the land in the area.

A landmark in the municipality is the Guttenberg Castle, the seat of the Guttenberg family.

The municipality's coat of arms is derived from that of the Guttenberg family.

Famous people
 Enoch zu Guttenberg (1946–2018), conductor
 Karl-Theodor zu Guttenberg (born 1971), his son, CSU politician and former Federal Minister.

Neighbourhoods
Guttenberg is made up of the following neighbourhoods:

References

Kulmbach (district)